Kinza Razzak is a Pakistani television actress and model. She has appeared in several television serials, telefilms and advertisements. She is better known for her role as Taniya in Shayad (2018) and as Dil Aara in Dilara (2018), the later of which earned her critical praise.

Filmography

Television series

Web series

References

External links
 
 
 
 

1992 births
Pakistani television actresses
People from Karachi
Living people
Pakistani female models
21st-century Pakistani actresses